Frej Gustav Rydergård (born 9 July 1984 in Falun) is a Swedish former handballer.

Achievements    
Elitserien:
Winner: 2009

Individual awards
 Elitserien Best Defensive Player: 2008, 2009

References

1984 births
People from Falun
Swedish male handball players
Living people
CS Dinamo București (men's handball) players
Swedish expatriates in Germany
Swedish expatriate sportspeople in Romania
Expatriate handball players
Sportspeople from Dalarna County